Dolni Lom is a village in the municipality of Chuprene, in Vidin Province, in northwestern Bulgaria.

References

Villages in Vidin Province

Public institutions [Edit | edit the code]
A community center in the village center, a continuation of the old community center founded by teacher Michael Aleksov Tatarov in 1927. There is a museum collection.
Cultural and natural attractions [edit | edit the code]
Soldier monument in the center of the village. It is built of white limestone in memory of the fallen from the village and the surrounding area during the war. It built in 1933 on a project borrowed from Leipzig (the only one in Bulgaria). Master builders were brothers from the neighboring village of Galabovo Varbovo.
Stone fountain in the center of the village. It was built with funds of the population in 1934 the idea and leadership of dolnolometsa Anto Zhivkov Neshin.
Church "Holy Trinity" in the village center. It was built with funds of the population in memory of threads uprisings. Consecrated in 1847 by Vidin bishop and Gornolomski pop Michael participant in Belogradchik uprising in 1850
Stone Cross (vow of St.. Spirit) in the village center. Such a letter crosses and ornaments in the past were 14 in number.
Colne Bridge - ednosvodest bridge on river Lom. Located in the upper (southern) end of the village. It was built by the Italians in 1908
Insurgent monument - about two kilometers southeast of the village in the "Dry Trench", the road to the village Pass. It built in 1959–60 in memory of the battle during the uprising in 1923
Right Dry seals cave - located about 2 km from the village, southeast of the hill hammer. Landmark. There are traces of cave bear. In 1972, it was an experiment to stay for people without contact with the outside world. Stay lasted 62 days.
Cave Levy Dry seals - located on the same hill, a few meters below right. Landmark. It is used by prehistoric man. Found pottery from the Roman era. In 1985 the cave was built and equipped geophysical observatory Professor. Eng. PhD in technical sciences Mladen Mladenovski (born in Dolni Lom). There have been conducted geodynamic measurements of crustal movements.
Bella wall - scenic rock karst spring of 1.5 kilometers south of the village on the road to the village of Gorni Lom. Landmark. In 2003 the fountain was built fountain in cooperation with the President of the cooperative "Light" of Dolni Lom, Ivan Mihailov.